Tooze is a surname. Notable people with the surname include:

Adam Tooze (born 1967), British historian
John Tooze (1938–2021), British scientist
Sharon Tooze, American scientist
Walter L. Tooze (1887–1956), American attorney and politician
Zena Tooze (born 1955), Canadian biologist